Hanyang Women's University is a private college in South Korea. The campus is located in Haengdang-dong, Seongdong-gu in Seoul.

History

The school began on December 20, 1974, as Hanyang Women's Vocational School, on the campus of Hanyang University by the school corporation Hanyang Academy. The school was upgraded to the status of Junior College, thus renamed as Hanyang Women's Junior College in December 1978. In March 1979, it moved from the Hanyang University campus to its current location. The college was renamed as Hanyang Women's College in 1998. In 2012 it attained university status, thus renamed as Hanyang Women's University. 

The university is a part of the Hanyang Foundation (한양학원) which also includes Hanyang University and a system of schools that educate children from kindergarten until high school.

In September 2003, the university established the Management System Research Institute and the Industry-University Cooperation Support Center. In November 2008, the Department of Social Physical Education and Practical Music was selected as the best department of department evaluation from the Korea College of Education. In February 2010, Hanyang Women's University was established as an affiliate organization. In July 2013, it opened an art museum and was selected as an excellent university for the education capacity enhancement project by the Ministry of Education.

Academics
Hanyang Women's University organizes 30 majors in 4 departments; they also offer professional bachelor's degree courses.
 Division of Technology
Department of Computer Science & Information Systems
Department of Internet Informatics
Department of Apparel Design
Department of Knit Fashion Design
Department of Textile Design
 Division of Natural Sciences
Department of Food & Nutrition
Department of Food Service Industry
Department of Dental Hygiene
Department of Public Health Administration
 Division of Humanities & Social Sciences
Department of Early Childhood Education
Department of International Tourism
Department of English
Department of Business Administration
Department of Tax and Accounting
Department of Woman Resources Development
Department of Japanese Interpretation
Department of Chinese
Department of Child Education & Welfare
 Division of Arts & Sports
Department of Industrial Design
Department of Interior Design
Department of Illustration
Department of Visual Media Design
Department of Ceramic Arts
Department of Creative Writing
Department of Sport & Leisure Studies
Department of Broadcasting & Visual Image Design
Department of Applied Music

Overseas exchange 
Hanyang Women's University has sister universities with whom it holds student exchanges with. 

 Long Island University
 George Washington University
 Queensland University of Technology
 The University of Newcastle, Australia

Notable alumni

Politicians 
 Shim Jae-ok , politician

Musicians

Film industry

Sports

See also
List of colleges and universities in South Korea
Education in South Korea

References

External links
Official school website 

Universities and colleges in Seoul
1974 establishments in South Korea
Educational institutions established in 1974
Women's universities and colleges in South Korea